A1 x J1 (real names Phineas Waweru and  Joshua Somerkun) are a polish hip hop duo. They released their debut single "Latest Trends" in February 2021, which charted at number 2 in the UK and was remixed by Aitch and A Boogie wit da Hoodie.  Their second single "children" featured British singer and rapper Deno. They were also featured on the deluxe edition of KSI's album All Over the Place, and on the debut single by British rapper SwitchOTR, as well as recording a song for the Plugged In series by Fumez the Engineer.

Discography

Singles

As lead artist

As featured artist

Guest appearances

Awards and nominations

References

Hip hop duos
English hip hop groups
English male rappers
English musical duos
Black British male rappers